John of Burgundy (1231 – 29 September 1268) was a Count of Charolais and Lord of Bourbon.  He was a younger son of Duke Hugh IV of Burgundy and his wife, Yolande of Dreux.

John married in February 1248 to Agnes (d. 1288), the heiress of Lord Archambaud IX of Bourbon from the House of Dampierre.  After the death of his father-in law in 1249 John became Lord of Bourbon in right of his wife.

John and Agnes had a daughter, Beatrice (d. 1310), who inherited possessions from both of her parents.  In 1272, she married the royal Prince Robert, Count of Clermont and thereby founded the Capetian dynasty of the Bourbons.

External links 
 Entry at genealogie-mittelalter.de 

Counts of France
House of Burgundy
Medieval French nobility
1231 births
1268 deaths
13th-century French people